Nooksack Tower is in North Cascades National Park in the U.S. state of Washington. Nooksack Tower looms to the west over Nooksack Cirque. The East Nooksack Glacier lies to the southeast, West Nooksack Glacier to the east and Price Glacier is on the north flanks of the tower. Nooksack Tower is one of the most difficult mountains to climb in the Cascade Range, with loose rock, 50-degree or greater slopes and ice ridges as well as accessibility issues and exposure, all weighing into the climbing equation. The descent may require ten or more rappels.

Climate
Nooksack Tower is located in the marine west coast climate zone of western North America. Most weather fronts originate in the Pacific Ocean, and travel northeast toward the Cascade Mountains. As fronts approach the North Cascades, they are forced upward by the peaks of the Cascade Range, causing them to drop their moisture in the form of rain or snowfall onto the Cascades (Orographic lift). As a result, the west side of the North Cascades experiences high precipitation, especially during the winter months in the form of snowfall. Due to its temperate climate and proximity to the Pacific Ocean, areas west of the Cascade Crest very rarely experience temperatures below  or above . During winter months, weather is usually cloudy, but, due to high pressure systems over the Pacific Ocean that intensify during summer months, there is often little or no cloud cover during the summer. Because of maritime influence, snow tends to be wet and heavy, resulting in high avalanche danger.

Geology
The North Cascades features some of the most rugged topography in the Cascade Range with craggy peaks, spires, ridges, and deep glacial valleys. The history of the formation of the Cascade Mountains dates back millions of years ago to the late Eocene Epoch. Small fragments of the oceanic and continental lithosphere called terranes created the North Cascades about 50 million years ago.

During the Pleistocene period dating back over two million years ago, glaciation advancing and retreating repeatedly scoured the landscape leaving deposits of rock debris. The "U"-shaped cross section of the river valleys are a result of recent glaciation. Uplift and faulting in combination with glaciation have been the dominant processes which have created the tall peaks and deep valleys of the North Cascades area.

References

External links
 Nooksack Tower aerial photo: PBase

Mountains of Washington (state)
North Cascades National Park
Mountains of Whatcom County, Washington